Jerónimo Cacciabue (born 24 January 1998) is an Argentine professional footballer who plays as a central midfielder for Ekstraklasa club Miedź Legnica, on loan from Newell's Old Boys.

Career
Cacciabue began his senior career with Newell's Old Boys, having signed from his local club Montes de Oca. The 2017–18 Argentine Primera División season saw Cacciabue begin to feature in senior football, with the midfielder making his pro debut on 16 April 2018 in the league against Talleres; having been an unused substitute three times in all competitions earlier in the season. In the match against Talleres, Cacciabue played the full duration of a 2–1 victory; with Newell's winning thanks to an 84th-minute winner from Cacciabue. He ended the 2017–18 season with four appearances, before appearing in twenty games in the 2018–19 campaign as he penned new terms.

On 4 July 2022, Cacciabue moved to Polish Ekstraklasa side Miedź Legnica on a one-year loan with an option to buy.

Career statistics
.

References

External links

1998 births
Living people
Footballers from Santa Fe, Argentina
Argentine footballers
Argentine people of Italian descent
Association football midfielders
Argentine Primera División players
Ekstraklasa players
Newell's Old Boys footballers
Miedź Legnica players
Argentine expatriate footballers
Expatriate footballers in Poland
Argentine expatriate sportspeople in Poland